"One Brief Moment" is an ethnic electronica song performed by Belgian singer Natacha Atlas. The song was written by Atlas and David Arnold and produced by Arnold for the Atlas' third album Gedida (1999). It was released as a single on April 19, 1999, in the United Kingdom.

Formats and track listings
These are the formats and track listings of major single releases of "One Brief Moment".

French CD single
(Released in April 1999)
 "One Brief Moment" (Edit) – 4:05
 "You Only Live Twice" – 4:37
 "One Brief Moment" (French Radio remix)

CD single
(MNT42CD; Released on 19 April 1999)
 "One Brief Moment" (Edit) – 4:05
 "You Only Live Twice" – 4:37
 "One Brief Moment" (Klute mix) – 6:04

7-inch vinyl single
(Released in April 1999)
 "One Brief Moment" (Edit) – 4:05
 "You Only Live Twice" – 4:37

Charts

Credits and personnel
The following people contributed to "One Brief Moment":
Natacha Atlas – lead vocals 
David Arnold – keyboards, percussion, guitar, programming, string arrangements
Nicholas Arnold – conducting
David White – mixing

References

External links
Official website

1999 singles
Electronic songs
Natacha Atlas songs
World music songs
1999 songs
Songs written by David Arnold
Songs written by Natacha Atlas